Apropos or À Propos may refer to:

apropos (Unix), a program used to search for program manual pages
A rootkit created by 121Media to install adware
À Propos, a Canadian radio program